The Roman Catholic Diocese of Coari is a diocese located in the city of Coari in the Ecclesiastical province of Manaus in Brazil.

The Roman Catholic Diocese of Coari was erected on 9 October 2013 by Pope Francis, and is a part of the Ecclesiastical Province of the Roman Catholic Archdiocese of Manaus, based in Manaus, Brazil.

It has been led since its elevation by its first Bishop, Marek Marian Piatek, C.Ss.R., a Polish native and a member of the Congregation of the Most Holy Redeemer (the Redemptorists).

History
 July 13, 1963, the Territorial Prelature of Coari was established from the Metropolitan Archdiocese of Manaus.
 October 9, 2013: Promoted as Diocese of Coari

Bishops

Ordnaries, in reverse chronological order
Prelates of Coari (Latin Church)
Mário Roberto Emmett Anglim, C.Ss.R. (April 24, 1964 – April 13, 1973)
Gutemberg Freire Régis, C.Ss.R. (July 23, 1978 – February 28, 2007)
Joércio Gonçalves Pereira, C.Ss.R. (coadjutor 2005–2007; bishop February 28, 2007 – July 22, 2009)
Marek Marian Piatek, C.Ss.R. (August 12, 2011 – October 9, 2013)
Bishops of Coari
 Marek Marian Piatek, C.Ss.R. (October 9, 2013–present)

References

 GCatholic.org
 Catholic Hierarchy

Roman Catholic dioceses in Brazil
Coari, Territorial Prelature of